Greenwood is a ghost town in Fayette County, West Virginia, United States. Greenwood appeared on USGS maps as late as 1912.

References

Geography of Fayette County, West Virginia
Ghost towns in West Virginia